The Aston Bulls were a rugby league football team based in Aston Township in Delaware County, Pennsylvania. The team played in the American National Rugby League (AMNRL), the United States' oldest competition, from 1998 until 2013. They were known as the Glen Mills Bulls until 2006.

The Glen Mills Bulls began play in the 1998 season as a charter member of the competition that eventually became the AMNRL. The team was affiliated with the Glen Mills Schools in the Glen Mills until 2006, when they relocated to nearby Aston Township and became the Aston Bulls. The team ceased operations when the AMNRL folded its domestic competition in 2013. During their run the Bulls were the AMNRL's most successful team on the field, advancing to the Grand Final eleven times (every year from 1998 to 2008) and winning the league championship six times.
The club record for most tries in the regular season is 14, which is held by Liam Mulhall who came to the club from Brisbane Norths Devils and played in the 2008 AMNRL season.

History
The team was founded in 1998 by Australian former rugby league footballer David Niu. Niu had been involved in promoting rugby league in the United States since the early 1990s, and introduced the sport to the Glen Mills Schools in the Glen Mills area of Delaware County, Pennsylvania, where he was employed as a teacher. In 1998 Niu's former teammate, Matthew Elliott, coach of England's Bradford Bulls team, visited Philadelphia and saw Niu's plans for the sport. Elliott and the Bulls agreed to support the Glen Mills club in its first year, providing them jerseys and the Bulls name. For the first nine years of operation the Bulls team and staff were made up of employees of the Glen Mills Schools, and the team played its games at the school's Jack Pearson Stadium in Concordville.

The Bulls were one of the charter franchises of Super League America, now the American National Rugby League, and quickly became the most dominant team in the competition. They won the league championship six times: 1998, 1999, 2000, 2001, 2004 and 2005. Additionally, they competed in the Grand Final in 2002, 2003 and 2006, when they hosted the 2006 American National Rugby League championship match, at which they lost narrowly to the Connecticut Wildcats in front of a crowd of 2,500.

After the 2006 season the Bulls ended their affiliation with the Glen Mills Schools and relocated to nearby Aston Township, renaming themselves the Aston Bulls. Since the relocation they have continued their uninterrupted streak of playoff appearances, advancing to the Grand Final in 2007 and 2008.

Uniform and colors
In their inaugural season the Bulls wore jerseys donated by the Bradford Bulls. Thereafter they adopted the colors of blue and white with the uniforms being predominantly blue, similar in style to the National Rugby League team the Canterbury Bulldogs, after the two clubs agreed to an affiliate partnership with each other. After the name change to the Aston Bulls, the club adopted the new colors of gold and white for their home uniform.

Current roster

Honors
AMNRL Championship titles: 6

The club won 6 AMNRL titles when known as the Glen Mills Bulls. They have additionally advanced to the Grand Final 3 further times.

See also
Rugby league in the United States
List of defunct rugby league clubs in the United States

References

External links
 Official page
 Aston Bulls at amnrl.com

American National Rugby League teams
Defunct rugby league teams in the United States
Rugby clubs established in 1998
Sports teams in Pennsylvania
Rugby league in Pennsylvania
1998 establishments in Pennsylvania